Mall of Arabia is a planned shopping mall; it will be a part of the City of Arabia in the Dubailand theme park premises in Dubai. Original announcements said it would be completed in 2008. Following the collapse of the Dubai real-estate market, the mall's opening has been delayed. In 2016, in favor of IMG Worlds of Adventure's opening date, it was announced that the mall will be revived within 10 years. According to the developers the 10 million square-foot mall will contain more than 1,000 retail outlets, a rooftop hotel, waterfront dining and entertainment, a theme park, an earth science museum, and a planetarium. It also will contain its own monorail system linked with the Dubai Metro along with a two-story underground parking garage capable of holding 10,400 vehicles.

See also
Mall of the Emirates
The Dubai Mall
Mall of Arabia (Jeddah)

References

Dubailand
Proposed buildings and structures in Dubai
Shopping malls in Dubai